This is an incomplete list of islands of Canada.

Arctic islands

Queen Elizabeth Islands

Adams Island
Alexander Island
Baillie-Hamilton Island
Bathurst Island
Borden Island
Brock Island
Buckingham Island
Byam Martin Island
Cameron Island
Coburg Island
Cornwall Island
Cornwallis Island
Devon Island
Eglinton Island
Ellesmere Island
Emerald Isle
Graham Island
Griffith Island (Nunavut)
Helena Island
Hoved Island
Île Vanier
King Christian Island
Little Cornwallis Island
Lougheed Island
Mackenzie King Island
Massey Island
Meighen Island
Melville Island
North Kent Island
Pioneer Island (Nunavut)
Prince Patrick Island
Stor Island
2092 other minor islands includingHans Island, a small uninhabited barren knoll off Ellesmere Island measuring 1.3 km² (shared with Denmark)

Belcher Islands

Flaherty Island
Innetalling Island
Kugong Island
Mavor Island
Moore Island
Snape Island
Split Island
Tukarak Island
Wiegand Island

Sverdrup Islands

Amund Ringnes Island
Axel Heiberg Island
Ellef Ringnes Island
Haig-Thomas Island

Other Arctic islands

Adams Island
Admiralty Island
Air Force Island
Akimiski Island
Akpatok Island
Angijak Island
Baffin Island
Banks Island
Big Island
Bray Island
Brevoort Island
Bylot Island
Charles Island
Charlton Island
Coats Island
Crown Prince Frederik Island
Dexterity Island
Edgell Island
Foley Island
Gateshead Island
Herschel Island
Igloolik Island
Jenny Lind Island
Kapuiviit (Jens Munk Island)
Killiniq Island
King William Island
Koch Island
Loks Land
Long Island (Frobisher Bay)
Long Island (Hudson Bay)
Mansel Island
Matty Island
Melbourne Island
Mill Island
Moodie Island
North Twin Island
Nottingham Island
O'Reilly Island
Padloping Island
Pandora Island
Prescott Island
Prince Charles Island
Prince of Wales Island
Resolution Island
Richards Island
Rowley Island
Russell Island
Salisbury Island
Sillem Island
Smith Island (Frobisher Bay)
Smith Island (Hudson Bay)
Somerset Island
Southampton Island
South Tweedsmuir Island
Stefansson Island
Tennent Island
Vansittart Island
Victoria Island
Wales Island (Nunavut)
Wales Island (Ungava)
White Island
34377 other minor islands

Newfoundland and Labrador

Baccalieu Island
Bell Island
Bell Island (Grey Islands)
Belle Isle
Brunette Island
Carbonear Island
Change Islands
Cod Island
Fogo Island
Funk Island
Great Colinet Island
Grey Islands
Groais Island
Horse Islands
Ireland's Eye Island
Kelly's Island
Kikkertavak Island
Killiniq Island
Long Island (Hermitage Bay)
Long Island (Placentia Bay)
Merasheen Island
Newfoundland
New World Island
Paul's Island
Puffin Island
Quirpon Island
Ramea Islands
Random Island
Red Island
South Aulatsivik Island
Tunungayualok Island

Nova Scotia

Barren Island
Big Tancook Island
Boularderie Island
Brier Island                                                    
Cape Breton Island
Cape Sable Island
Deadmans Island
Devils Island
Dover Island
Georges Island
Henry Island
Lawlor Island
Long Island
Île Madame
McNabs Island
Oak Island
Partridge Island
Petit de Grat Island
Pictou Island
Port Hood Island
Sable Island
Lot No 44, Briar Lake
Seal Island
Sherose Island
Sober Island
Southwest Island
Stoddart Island
Saint Paul Island
Tusket Islands
Hirtle Island

Prince Edward Island

 Boughton Island
 Governors Island
 Hog Island Sand Hills
 Holman Island
 Lennox Island
 Murray Islands
 Panmure Island
 St. Peters Island

New Brunswick

Quebec

Anticosti Island
Entry Island
Île Bonaventure
Île Bizard
Îles de Boucherville
Île de la Visitation
Île-des-Sœurs
Île d'Orléans
Île Dorval
Île Jésus
Île Notre-Dame
Île Perrot
Île René-Levasseur
Île Sainte-Hélène
Îles Laval
Island of Montreal
Magdalen Islands

Ontario

Amherst Island
Manitoulin Island
Thousand Islands
Toronto Islands
Wolfe Island

Manitoba
Black Island
Elk Island
George Island
Hecla Island
Matheson Island
Reindeer Island
Sandy Islands
Spider Islands

Saskatchewan
Beaver Island
Cumberland Island
Fleming Island
Hofer Island
Lenz Island
Sandy Island
Johns Island
Todd Island
Turner Island
 Umisk Island

Alberta
Bustard Island
Burntwood Island
Castle Island
Prince's Island
Spirit Island

British Columbia

British Columbia has a number of groups of islands falling within the following geographic areas:

South Coast, including:
Vancouver Island
Gulf of Georgia region (Southern Gulf Islands, Northern Gulf Islands, Discovery Islands, Sunshine Coast, Howe Sound)
West Coast of Vancouver Island Broken Islands Group, Cape Scott, Nootka Sound, Kyuquot Sound, Clayoquot Sound
Lower Mainland, primarily consisting of river or lake islands in Burrard Inlet, Harrison Lake, and the Fraser River.
Central Coast, including:
Johnstone Strait-Queen Charlotte Strait region (Broughton Archipelago)
Fitz Hugh Sound-Dean Channel region
North Coast, including:
Queen Charlotte Sound-Hecate Strait region
Dixon Entrance-Portland Channel region
Haida Gwaii (Queen Charlotte Islands)
Interior, including islands in:
Lake Okanagan
 The Fraser Canyon (Fraser River)
 The Kootenay and Columbia Rivers

See also

 Canadian Arctic Archipelago
 List of islands
 List of Canadian islands by area
 List of Canadian islands by population

References
The islands of Canada: Sea Islands

 
 
Canada